Dzięciołówka  is a village in the administrative district of Gmina Korycin, within Sokółka County, Podlaskie Voivodeship, in north-eastern Poland.

References

Villages in Sokółka County